Salt is the fifth full-length album by Danish band Wuthering Heights. It has been received with great reviews from the fans and the press. The album takes themes that involve the sea, and other myths and tales from the sailor's culture.

As usual in Wuthering Height's albums, the mixture between genres like power metal, progressive metal and folk metal can be noticed clearly. In this specific album it can be noticed a heavier but still melodic sound

Track listing
All songs written by Erik Ravn.
 Away!	- 01:27	
 The Desperate Poet	   -      06:28	
 The Mad Sailor	  -    06:19	
 The Last Tribe (Mother Earth)   - 07:54	
 Tears	              -         05:55	
 Weather the Storm	   -       06:53	
 The Field	               -     05:58	
 Water of Life	         -          02:06
 Lost at Sea	        -           16:38

Personnel
Erik Ravn – guitar, keyboards, vocals
Andreas Lindahl – keyboards
Martin Arendal – guitar
Morten Sørensen – drums
Nils Patrik Johansson – vocals
Teddy Möller - bass

References

External links
Official Wuthering Heights website
Encyclopaedia Metallum
Band's MySpace

Wuthering Heights (band) albums
2010 albums

it:Salt
fi:Salt